Ben Yennie is an American producer's representative, speaker, author, and entrepreneur working at the intersection of technology and film. He's helped to package, finance, market, and distribute 15 films to date, generally receiving the title of executive producer for his role as a producer's rep. He has written three books to date (most notably a guide to the American Film Market and a macroeconomic study of the film industry), co-founded a film oriented project management company called ProductionNext, and is also known as a blogger, and event organizer.

Producer's Representative 
In 2014 Ben founded Guerrilla Rep Media, a producer's representation firm. Some of the films he's worked on have been released theatrically and shown on outlets such as Starz and Showtime. He is best known for Queen of the Capital, Goodland, Cicada Moon, and The Devil's Restaurant. Films he has represented have been accepted to the Slamdance Film Festival and many other film festivals.

Speaker 
Ben has spoken at many conferences including the Seattle Film Summit, The Dona Ana Arts Council, and various in person events in and around San Francisco. He has also appeared on many podcasts, including The Lean Startup Podcast, the Indie Film Hustle Podcast, the Making Movies is Hard Podcast, and the Nancy Fulton Podcast.

Author 
Ben is the author of The Guerrilla Rep: American Film Market Distribution Success on No Budget. The book is currently in its second edition. Debbie Brubaker, unit production manager of Woody Allen's Blue Jasmine, Tim Burton's Big Eyes, and Gus Van Sant's When We Rise wrote the preface. Oscar-nominated producer Marc Smolowitz wrote the foreword. This book has been used as a supplemental text at multiple film schools. Ben also wrote the State of the Film Industry Report, which was a first of its kind report on the macroeconomics of the film industry. Data was gathered with the help of IndieWire, Stage 32, and Fandor. Ben also heads the blogs for Guerrilla Rep Media which focuses primarily on the business of the film industry and serves as editor for the ProductionNext blog which focuses more on production and general critique of the film industry.

Entrepreneur 
In 2015, Ben co-founded a project management company called ProductionNext. ProductionNext is a cloud-based project management system specifically designed for independent film. Ben has served periodically as an adviser and organizer for several angel investment groups targeted at the arts. Previously, Ben served as executive director for Producer Foundry, a community organization and business school for independent film.

References

American film producers
Living people
21st-century American businesspeople
21st-century American writers
Year of birth missing (living people)